Betania (pronounced: Bai-TAHN-ee-uh) is a town and municipality in the Colombian department of Antioquia. Part of the subregion of Southwestern Antioquia. It exists 33 mi/53 km SW of Medellín. Main industries include coffee, sugarcane, cacao, and livestock.

Climate
Betania has a tropical rainforest climate (Af) with heavy to very heavy rainfall year-round.

See also
Betania, Venezuela

References

Municipalities of Antioquia Department